The Chinese Taipei national under-18 and under-19 basketball team is a national basketball team of Chinese Taipei, administered by the Chinese Taipei Basketball Association.
It represents the country in international under-18 and under-19 (under age 18 and under age 19) basketball competitions.

See also
Chinese Taipei national basketball team
Chinese Taipei national under-17 basketball team
Chinese Taipei women's national under-19 basketball team

References

External links
 Archived records of Chinese Taipei team participations

U-19
Men's national under-19 basketball teams